Yona Wallach (June 10, 1944 – September 26, 1985) was an Israeli poet. Her surname also appears as Volach. She is considered a revolutionary Israeli feminist and post-modernist.

Wallach was a promising young poet, though she neglected her talents for many years as she used drugs and explored the Jewish mysticism that influenced much of her work. She didn't receive critical acclaim for her work until the late 70s.

Wallach developed breast cancer in 1981 and refused treatment for many years. She died in 1985.

Biography

Early life 
Yona Wallach was born on June 10, 1944 in Kiryat Ono to parents Michael and Esther Wallach. The name Yona was given to her in honor of three dead relatives. At the age of four, her father was brutally tortured and killed in the 1948 Arab-Israeli War. Wallach and her older sister Nira were raised by their widowed mother on Michael Wallach Street in the town of Kiryat Ono — a town which her father founded near Tel Aviv. As a young child Wallach did well in elementary school, but as she grew older she became more rebellious, dressing androgynously in her dead father's clothes and having her first abortion at age sixteen. She was expelled from high school after tenth grade, and then spent a short time at the Avni Arts School.

Around the age of nineteen she left home for Jerusalem. Although she never received formal higher education, she was very observant and an avid reader, claiming to have learned from the world around her. She began to associate with petty thieves and drug dealers, intrigued by their lifestyle and the ugly reality of the world.

Psychiatric hospitalization and sexuality 
Wallach suffered from a few mental breakdowns, the first of which occurred in her late teens. She claims to have freely admitted herself into a psychiatric hospital around the age of twenty to better understand the madness her friends were experiencing, but in reality she agreed to be admitted after developing impulses to harm her mother. At the mental institution she met a doctor who took advantage of her willingness to use drugs and treated her with LSD therapy, though he too was inexperienced with dosages and once almost killed her through an overdose. She enjoyed using psychotics and described the hallucinations as having expanded her consciousness. Her therapist at the institution acknowledged her deviant sexuality in his records, noting that she identifies as homosexual even though she still pursues relationships with men. She was known for stealing the girlfriends of her male friends.

She was admitted to a psychiatric hospital for a second time when she was 24 years old, where she stayed for four and a half months. Symptoms of a drug-induced psychotic break had been intensifying, and friends were concerned that she might be suicidal. She claims to have only felt safe and protected once her works had been published and her fame was secured.

Final years and death 
After Wallach was released from her second visit to the mental institution, she went to stay with her mother back in Kiryat Ono. Her mother suffered from Parkinson's disease and Wallach became her primary caregiver. She did not care much for her mother; her medical records suggest that Wallach was responsible for some of the bruising on her body. She lived off of her mother's financial support since she did not have a steady job. Wallach attempted suicide in 1974 but refused hospitalization.

Wallach began performing her poetry with a rock band she formed with two of her male musician friends. They would not let her sing her poetry, only recite it, because she was so out of tune. Wallach excited crowds with her provocative clothing and explicitly sexual poems.

In 1981, at the age of 36, Wallach found a lump in her breast and was diagnosed with breast cancer. She refused treatment for two years, believing the same sort of spirit that drove her poetry would also aid in her recovery. One morning she awoke with a pain in her chest and all of her bones aching, finally spurring her decision to seek treatment. She met a doctor in Kiryat Ono who told her she had less than eight years to live. From this point on she continued treatment, soliciting friends to help administer her medicine. They described her as being very lonely during this time; her rough demeanor had been substituted for something gentler and more childlike. She died on September 26, 1985.

Literary career

Wallach knew from a young age that she wanted to be a writer. When she was kicked out of school in the tenth grade, the headmistress cited Wallach as having neglected her studies in preference to doodling and writing poems. At the age of eighteen she first attempted to be published by Eked publishing house and was rejected, likely because she did not permit any revisions. She became a member of the "Tel Aviv Poets" group, which was influenced by American Beat Poetry, with poets Meir Weiseltier and Yair Hurvitz.

It is unknown at what age she wrote her first published poems. The first of her poems to be published, one without a title, was printed on January 3, 1964 in Yediot Aharanot when she was nineteen. Hurvitz submitted the poem for her to the literary magazine. In the following months five more of her poems had been published in various magazines and periodicals, and her name was mentioned in Ha-Boker as an "important young Israeli avant-garde poet."

She spent the next few years neglecting her writing to experiment with sex and drugs, which decidedly influenced much of her future poetry. Wallach never left the country seeking intellectual inspiration like many of her literary counterparts. Instead, she surrounded herself with "societal misfits" and spent time exploring her inner self and Kabbalah — the ancient, mystical Jewish tradition of interpreting the Bible.

Though she was well known in literary circles, she received little critical acclaim until the mid 1970s. Her 1976 volume of poems, Shira, received instant acclaim. She was unanimously accepted into the Tel-Aviv Foundation for Culture and Art and won three literary prizes between the summers of 1977 and 1978. Wallach became an Israeli celebrity, with tabloids following her around and her work becoming more widely published. Her final collection, Mofa, was published posthumously in 1985.

Books in Hebrew

Things, Achshav, 1966 [Devarim]
Two Gardens, Daga, 1969 [Shnei Ganim]
Collected Poems, Siman Kriah, 1976 [Shirim]
Wild Light, Echut, 1983 [Or Pere]
Forms, Hakibbutz Hameuchad/Siman Kriah, 1985 [Tzurot]
Appearance, Hakibbutz Hameuchad, 1985 [Mofah]
Selected Poems 1963–1985, Hakibbutz Hameuchad/Siman Kriah, 1992

Books in translation
Selected Poems, English: New York, Sheep Meadow, 1997
Wallach, Yona, and Zisquit, Linda. Let the Words : Selected Poems / Yona Wallach ; Translated by Linda Stern Zisquit. Riverdale-on-Hudson, NY: Sheep Meadow Press, 2006.
Individual poems have been published in: Arabic, Chinese, Czech, Dutch, English, Esperanto, Estonian, French, German, Greek, Hungarian, Italian, Japanese, Polish, Romanian, Russian, Serbo-Croatian, Spanish, Vietnamese, and Yiddish.

Awards
 awarded by the Municipality of Holon (1978)

See also
 Hebrew literature
 Zelda (poet)
Rachel (poet)
Women in Israel

References

External links
 The Modern Hebrew Poem Itself, 2003, 
 Profile at Poetry International Web
 A short biography, at The Institute for the Translation of Hebrew Literature website
Her poem "tefillin" translated to Arabic

 Her poem "a summary (of a conversation)" Google-translated to something resembling English

1944 births
1985 deaths
Feminist musicians
Bisexual feminists
Bisexual musicians
Bisexual women
Bisexual poets
Bisexual Jews
Deaths from cancer in Israel
Deaths from breast cancer
Israeli feminists
20th-century Israeli Jews
Israeli women poets
Jewish feminists
Israeli bisexual people
Israeli LGBT poets
20th-century Israeli women writers
20th-century Israeli poets
People from Kiryat Ono
Jewish women writers
20th-century Israeli LGBT people